Maithripala Senanayake (7 July 1916 – 12 July 1998) was a Sri Lankan  politician and  Governor of the North-Central province. He first studied at St. Joseph's College, Anuradhapura then at St. John's Jaffna, where he attained a mastery in the Tamil Language and later at Nalanda College Colombo.

He entered parliament from Medawachchiya Electorate in 1947 when then Ceylon held its first parliamentary elections.

When D.S. Senanayake picked his Cabinet in 1952 this promising young man from Raja Rata, Maithripala Senanayake was appointed as Parliamentary Secretary to the Ministry of Home Affairs.

Later he not only resigned from the post he held, but also from the UNP, after submitting resignation to Prime Minister Dudley Senanayake. At the following General Election, he retained the Medawachchiya seat as an Independent.

Then followed by some momentous years S.W.R.D. Bandaranaike was biding his time after he had resigned from UNP and making plans for the future with his nascent Sri Lanka Freedom Party and offered a place to Maithripala Senanayake, who was then an Independent MP in Parliament.

Senanayake has held many cabinet portfolios and has been Acting Prime Minister 19 times, Leader of the House, Chief Government Whip, and Deputy Leader of the Opposition at various times, In the realm of Foreign Affairs, Maithripala Senanayake has also played a major role, when the then Prime Minister Mrs. Sirimavo Bandaranaike was President of the Non-aligned Movement, he led the Sri Lanka delegation to the Non-aligned Conference held in Colombo.
He represented Parliament since 1947 to 1994 becoming the only person in Sri Lanka to represent Parliament for 47 years continuously. In the 1989 election which was the first Parliamentary election to be held under the proportional representation he entered Parliament as a National list member. He was not appointed to Parliament in 1994. However he was appointed as the governor of the North Central Province in the same year which he held until his death.

References

 

 By L. M. Samarasinghe
 By Lakshman Jayakody 
 By L. M. Samarasinghe 
 By Tissa Karaliyatta 

1916 births
Members of the 1st Parliament of Ceylon
Members of the 2nd Parliament of Ceylon
Members of the 3rd Parliament of Ceylon
Members of the 4th Parliament of Ceylon
Members of the 5th Parliament of Ceylon
Members of the 6th Parliament of Ceylon
Members of the 7th Parliament of Ceylon
Members of the 8th Parliament of Sri Lanka
Members of the 9th Parliament of Sri Lanka
Transport ministers of Sri Lanka
Governors of North Central Province, Sri Lanka
1998 deaths
Sri Lankan Buddhists
Alumni of Nalanda College, Colombo
Alumni of St. John's College, Jaffna
Trade ministers of Sri Lanka
Industries ministers of Sri Lanka
Parliamentary secretaries of Ceylon
Culture ministers of Sri Lanka
Power ministers of Sri Lanka